Melanargia titea, the Levantine marbled white, is a butterfly of the family Nymphalidae.

Distribution 
It is found in Syria, Jordan, the Palestinian Territories, Israel, Armenia, Lebanon, Iran and Turkey.

Description 
The wingspan is about 55 mm. Adults are on wing from April to June.

The larvae feed on Gramineae and Poaceae species.

Subspecies
Melanargia titea titea
Melanargia titea wiskotti (Röber, 1896) (Turkey)

Taxonomy
Recent research suggest Melanargia titea is in fact a subspecies of Melanargia larissa, while Melanargia titea wiskotti is raised to full-species rank.

References

Melanargia
Butterflies of Asia
Taxa named by Johann Christoph Friedrich Klug